Amaghu is an abandoned village in the Areni Municipality of the Vayots Dzor Province of Armenia.

History 
The village was populated by Azerbaijanis. In March-April 1989, ethnic clashes and incidents became frequent because of the Nagorno-Karabakh conflict. In order to prevent further clashes, the leadership of Yeghegnadzor and Vayk regions organized the safe transfer of Azeris to Nakhichevan. Armenian refugees who were deported from different settlements of Nakhichevan (Nu Aznaberd) and Azerbaijan settled in the village.

References

External links 

Former populated places in Vayots Dzor Province